Haskell House may refer to:

in the United States

Ida M. Rice House, Colorado Springs, Colorado, also known as Haskell House, listed on the National Register of Historic Places (NRHP)
Haskell House (Denver, Colorado), listed on the NRHP in Denver County, Colorado
Haskell-Long House, Middleburg, Florida, NRHP-listed
Squire Ignatius Haskell House, Deer Isle, Hancock County, Maine, NRHP-listed
Edward H. Haskell Home for Nurses, Boston, Massachusetts, NRHP-listed
William Haskell House, Gloucester, Massachusetts, NRHP-listed 
Charles Haskell House, Newton, Massachusetts, NRHP-listed
Winslow–Haskell Mansion, Newton, Massachusetts, NRHP-listed
Haskell's Bloomfield Villa, Montclair, Essex County, New Jersey
Haskell House (New Windsor, New York), in Orange County, NRHP-listed

in New Zealand
Haskell House (New Zealand), one of Kaiapoi's oldest buildings; demolished in June 2013 after earthquake damage